Nesria Al-Jelassi (also Nesria Jelassi, ; born 19 August 1989) is a Tunisian judoka, who played for the lightweight category. She is a two-time Tunisian judo champion, and a four-time medalist for the 57 and 63 kg classes at the African Judo Championships. She also won a gold medal at the 2011 All-Africa Games in Maputo, Mozambique, and silver at the 2007 All-Africa Games in Algiers, Algeria.

Jelassi represented Tunisia at the 2008 Summer Olympics in Beijing, where she competed for the women's lightweight class (57 kg). She defeated Cuba's Yurisleydis Lupetey in the preliminary round of sixteen, before losing out the quarterfinal match, by an ippon and a tai otoshi (body drop), to Australian judoka and five-time Olympian Maria Pekli. Because her opponent advanced further into the semi-finals, Jelassi offered another shot for the bronze medal by entering the repechage rounds. Unfortunately, she finished only in ninth place, after losing out the second repechage bout to Hungary's Bernadett Baczkó, who successfully scored an ippon and a kuzure kesa gatame (broken scarf hold), at three minutes and twenty-two seconds.

References

External links

NBC Olympics Profile

Tunisian female judoka
Living people
Olympic judoka of Tunisia
Judoka at the 2008 Summer Olympics
1989 births
African Games gold medalists for Tunisia
African Games medalists in judo
African Games silver medalists for Tunisia
Competitors at the 2007 All-Africa Games
Competitors at the 2011 All-Africa Games
20th-century Tunisian women
21st-century Tunisian women